The Tax Credit Assistance Program (TCAP) is a Federal housing grant program administered by HUD which assists Low Income Housing Tax Credit (LIHTC) projects funded during 2007, 2008 and 2009.  The TCAP program is part of the American Recovery and Reinvestment Act which was signed by President Obama on February 17, 2009.  The program is designed to assist troubled LIHTC deals struggling to find a tax credit investor.

As a result of the faltering economy and financial markets, the value of Low Income Housing Tax Credits plummeted in 2008 and continued to decline during 2009.  Most LIHTC deals struggle to find investors.  The TCAP program provides supplemental grant funds to make the project feasible.

Administration of the TCAP funds at the Federal level occurs at HUD.  HUD then delegates administration of the program on the state level to the designated housing finance agency charged with administering the LIHTC program.  HUD established the basic requirements of the program and the state housing finance agencies established more specific qualification and award criteria.

See also
Tax Credit Assistance Program (TCAP), Official HUD TCAP Page
"HUD Issues Tax Credit Assistance Program (TCAP) guidance", Nixon Peabody, May 5, 2009

Affordable housing